Woman's Working Band House is a historic house in Tallahassee, Leon County, Florida. It is located at 648 W. Brevard St. in Frenchtown, the oldest surviving African-American community in Florida.

It was added to the National Register of Historic Places on October 20, 2010.

This completely restored National Register Property currently (2018) houses the B Sharps Jazz Club. This house is one of the few recognized, extant properties financed jointly by rank and file and upper class African-American women. Its cornerstone was laid in 1921 by the Woman's [sic] Working Band and it was built to serve as an Old Folks Home.

References

National Register of Historic Places in Tallahassee, Florida
African-American history of Florida
Buildings and structures in Tallahassee, Florida
Housing for the elderly
Jazz clubs in the United States
History of women in Florida